The City of Canada Bay is a local government area in the Inner West of Sydney, New South Wales, Australia. The city was formed on 1 December 2000, following the merger of Concord and Drummoyne councils. The city is ultimately named after Canada Bay, a bay on the Parramatta River.

The Mayor of the City of Canada Bay Council is Cr. Angelo Tsirekas, who was originally elected Mayor as a member of the Australian Labor Party, but now a member of Our Local Community as of 2021.

Location and topography 
The City of Canada Bay is located in the northern part of the Inner West region of Sydney. To the north it is bounded by the Parramatta River, and to the south by Parramatta Road. In the east and west, it is bounded by two large bays: Iron Cove in the east, and Homebush Bay in the west. At its centre is a third large bay, Hen and Chicken Bay. (The eponymous Canada Bay is an inlet of the larger Hen and Chicken Bay.) As a result, the area is largely in the form of two peninsulas, linked by a narrow strip of land at its centre, which is the location of the eponymous suburb of Canada Bay. As a result of its geographical layout, many of the suburbs in the City of Canada Bay enjoy water frontages onto one of the bays of Parramatta River.

Localities in the local government area 

Suburbs in the City of Canada Bay are:

 Abbotsford
 Breakfast Point
 Cabarita
 Canada Bay
 Chiswick
 Concord
 Concord West
 Drummoyne
 Five Dock
 Liberty Grove
 Mortlake
 North Strathfield
 Rhodes
 Rodd Point
 Russell Lea
 Strathfield (Most of the suburb lies within the Municipality of Strathfield with other parts in Burwood Council)
 Wareemba

Some of the localities in the City of Canada Bay are:

 Birkenhead Point
 Concord Repatriation General Hospital

Demographics 
At the  there were  people in the Canada Bay local government area; of these 48.1 per cent were male and 51.9 per cent were female. Aboriginal and Torres Strait Islander people made up 0.5 per cent of the population. The median age of people in the City of Canada Bay was 36 years. Children aged 0 – 14 years made up 16.2 per cent of the population and people aged 65 years and over made up 14.7 per cent of the population. Of people in the area aged 15 years and over, 50.8 per cent were married and 9.3 per cent were either divorced or separated.

When compared with total population growth of Australia for the same period, being 8.8 per cent, population growth in Canada Bay local government area was nearly double the national average. The median weekly income for residents within the City of Canada Bay is significantly higher than the national average.

Council

History

Current composition and election method
Canada Bay City Council is composed of nine Councillors, including the Mayor, for a fixed four-year term of office. The Mayor has been directly elected since 2004 while the eight other Councillors are elected proportionally as one ward. The most recent election was held on 4 December 2021, and the makeup of the council, including the Mayor, was as follows:

The current Council, elected in 2021, in order of election, is:

History
A 2015 review of local government boundaries by the NSW Government Independent Pricing and Regulatory Tribunal recommended that the City of Canada Bay merge with adjoining councils. In May 2016 Strathfield Council challenged the proposed merger between Strathfield, Burwood and Canada Bay and commenced proceedings in the New South Wales Land and Environment Court. After the Court heard that there were legal flaws in the report from the State Government appointed delegate who examined the proposal for merging the councils, the NSW Government withdrew from the case and the merger proposal stalled. In July 2017, the Berejiklian government decided to abandon the forced merger of the Strathfield, Burwood and Canada Bay local government areas, along with several other proposed forced mergers.

See also

List of local government areas of New South Wales
 City of Canada Bay Museum

References

External links
 City of Canada Bay website
 Suburbs of Canada Bay
 Archived site with a brief history of the area
 Canada in Australia: Canadian Department of Foreign and International Affairs

 
Populated places established in 2000
Canada Bay
Canada Bay